Charalambos "Bambos" Charalambous (born 2 December 1967) is a British Labour Party politician serving as the Member of Parliament (MP) for Enfield Southgate since 2017, and the Shadow Minister for the Middle East and North Africa since 2021.

Early life
Charalambous was raised in Bowes Park in north London. His parents come from Kalo Chorio and Fasoulla, both near Limassol, in Cyprus. He was educated at Tottenhall Infants' School, St Michael-at-Bowes Junior School (where he is now a school governor), Chace Boys' Comprehensive School, followed by Tottenham College and then Liverpool Polytechnic (now Liverpool John Moores University).  He read for a law degree and was elected as vice president of the Students' Union in 1990.

Career
Charalambous is a solicitor. Before and until his election as MP, he worked for Hackney Council in their housing litigation team.

Charalambous served as a member of Enfield Council for the Palmers Green ward for 24 years.  He also served as an Associate Cabinet Member for Leisure, Culture, Localism and Young People.

Parliamentary career
Charalambous was the Labour candidate for Epping Forest in 2005, losing to the Conservative incumbent Eleanor Laing. He later contended Enfield Southgate in 2010 and 2015, before being elected in 2017, unseating David Burrowes who had served as the MP for that constituency since 2005.

Charalambous served on the Justice Select Committee.  He also served as a member of the All-Party Parliamentary Groups on London, Cyprus, Crossrail Two, Autism, Sex Equality, Music, Global Education For All and London's Planning and Built Environment.

In January 2018, he was appointed Parliamentary Private Secretary (PPS) to Rebecca Long-Bailey, Shadow Secretary of State for Business, Energy and Industrial Strategy. In December 2018, he was appointed as an Opposition (Labour) Whip. Charalambous was appointed as a Shadow Minister for Justice in January 2020.

Following Keir Starmer's election as Labour leader in April 2020, he joined the shadow Home Office team as the Shadow Minister for Crime Reduction and Courts. Charalambous swapped roles with Holly Lynch in a minor reshuffle in May 2021, becoming the Shadow Minister for Immigration.

References

External links

1967 births
Living people
Labour Party (UK) MPs for English constituencies
People from Enfield, London
UK MPs 2017–2019
UK MPs 2019–present
English people of Greek Cypriot descent
English solicitors
People educated at Chace Community School
Alumni of Liverpool John Moores University
Alumni of The College of Haringey, Enfield and North East London
Councillors in the London Borough of Enfield
Labour Party (UK) councillors